Panchavarnathatha is a 2018 Indian Malayalam-language comedy film directed by Ramesh Pisharody and co-written with Hari P. Nair. It was produced by Maniyanpilla Raju through Maniyanpilla Raju Productions, and stars Jayaram and Kunchacko Boban. Principal photography began in Velloor, Kerala on 10 January 2018. The film was released on 14 April 2018 during the Vishu holiday.

Plot
The story revolves around Vijayan Joseph Muhammed, a unique person who owns a pet shop. He had come to this place years back with a circus troupe. The pet shop is a concern to many of his neighbours. Kalesh is the MLA of this particular constituency and the next election is nearing. While attending the first holy communion of Abraham's daughter, Kalesh's wife Chithra abducts one Macaw. And the pet owner gets the video of Chithra in which she takes the parrot. As for the circumstances they allow him to stay in their home for the sake of elections. One day Vijayan is offered a job but he refuses it and cites that he is not feeling well. The next day, Velu tries to wake up the pet owner after his phone beeps but he doesn't get up. He is declared dead. Everyone from the local neighbourhood mourns and weep from Vijayan's death. Finally, Kalesh sends off the man's Macaw to an unfortunate girl, who had earlier wished to have it. Then Kalesh and Chithra go home.

Cast

 Jayaram as Vijayan Joseph Mohammed
Kunchacko Boban as MLA Kalesh
 Anusree as Chithra Kalesh
 Ashokan as Udayan
 Maniyanpilla Raju as Abraham
 Joju George as Nazeer
 Mallika Sukumaran as Sreelatha Teacher
 Salim Kumar as Adv. Jimmy 
 Dharmajan Bolgatty as Velu
 Prem Kumar as SI K.O Rangan
 Janardhanan as Bride's Father
 Tini Tom as James Thomas
 Kunchan as Anil, Pet Buyer
 Seema G. Nair as Deepa Udayan
 Subi Suresh as Chithra's Friend
 Nandhan Unni as Unnikrishnan
 Chembil Ashokan as Eappachen
 Vinod Kedamangalam as Eappachen's Assistant
 Chali Pala as Kunjachan, Wedding Guest
 Balaji Sharma as Sabu, Jimmy's Assistant
 Kalabhavan Haneef as Ajayan, Jimmy's Assistant
 Sajan Palluruthy as Chacko, Jimmy's Assistant
 K. T. S. Padannayil as Babu
 Devichandana as Chinnamma
 Manju Pathrose as Servant
 Dini Daniel as Bus Conductor
 Kanakalatha as Bride's Mother
 Bindu Murali as Nun
 Jis Joy as Pet Buyer (Cameo Appearance)
 Sreejith Ravi as Pet Buyer's Son (Photo Presence)
 Subeesh Sudhi as Thoma, Driver
 Firoz Azeez as an artist in dubbing studio

Production
Panchavarnathatha is the directorial debut of Ramesh Pisharody and he co-wrote the film with Hari P. Nair. It was originally meant to be directed by Nadirshah, who suggested Pisharody to direct it himself. Since Maniyanpilla Raju had earlier suggested Pisharody to direct a film some years ago, he approached Raju for investing the film to which he agreed. Principal photography commenced on 10 January 2018 at Velloor, Kottayam in Kerala. The main locations are Karikode, Peruva and Pala.

Music 

The music of the film is composed by M. Jayachandran and Nadirshah, while lyrics is written by Santhosh Varma and B. K. Harinarayanan. The full soundtrack album consisting of 4 tracks was released on 5 April 2018 by Manorama Music.

Release
The film was released on 14 April 2018. The film was a commercial success at the box office

References

External links
 

2018 films
2010s Malayalam-language films
2018 comedy films
Indian comedy films
2018 directorial debut films